Claviphantes is a genus of Asian dwarf spiders that was first described by A. V. Tanasevitch & Michael I. Saaristo in 2006.  it contains only two species, both found in Nepal: C. bifurcatoides and C. bifurcatus.

See also
 List of Linyphiidae species

References

Araneomorphae genera
Linyphiidae
Spiders of Asia
Taxa named by Michael Saaristo